In chemistry, an ester is a compound derived from an acid (organic or inorganic) in which the hydrogen atom (H) of at least one acidic hydroxyl group of that acid is replaced by an organyl group. According to some authors, organyl derivatives of acidic hydrogen of other acids are esters as well (e.g. amides), but not according to the IUPAC.

Glycerides are fatty acid esters of glycerol; they are important in biology, being one of the main classes of lipids and comprising the bulk of animal fats and vegetable oils. Lactones are cyclic carboxylic esters; naturally occurring lactones are mainly 5- and 6-membered ring lactones. Lactones contribute to the aroma of fruits, butter, cheese, vegetables like celery and other foods.

Esters can be formed from oxoacids (e.g. esters of acetic acid, carbonic acid, sulfuric acid, phosphoric acid, nitric acid, xanthic acid), but also from acids that do not contain oxygen (e.g. esters of thiocyanic acid and trithiocarbonic acid). An example of an ester formation is the substitution reaction between a carboxylic acid and an alcohol (R'OH), forming an ester, where R stands for any group (organic or inorganic) and R′ stands for organyl group.

Organyl esters of carboxylic acids typically have a pleasant smell; those of low molecular weight are commonly used as fragrances and are found in essential oils and pheromones. They perform as high-grade solvents for a broad array of plastics, plasticizers, resins, and lacquers, and are one of the largest classes of synthetic lubricants on the commercial market. Polyesters are important plastics, with monomers linked by ester moieties. Esters of phosphoric acid form the backbone of DNA molecules. Esters of nitric acid, such as nitroglycerin, are known for their explosive properties.

There are compounds in which an acidic hydrogen of acids mentioned in this article are not replaced by an organyl, but by some other group. According to some authors, those compounds are esters as well (e.g. according to them, trimethylstannyl acetate (or trimethyltin acetate)  is a trimethylstannyl ester of acetic acid, and dibutyltin dilaurate  is a dibutylstannylene ester of lauric acid).

Nomenclature

Etymology 
The word ester was coined in 1848 by a German chemist Leopold Gmelin, probably as a contraction of the German , "acetic ether".

IUPAC nomenclature 

The names of esters that are formed from an alcohol and an acid, are derived from the parent alcohol and the parent acid, where the latter may be organic or inorganic. Esters derived from the simplest carboxylic acids are commonly named according to the more traditional, so-called "trivial names" e.g. as formate, acetate, propionate, and butyrate, as opposed to the IUPAC nomenclature methanoate, ethanoate, propanoate, and butanoate. Esters derived from more complex carboxylic acids are, on the other hand, more frequently named using the systematic IUPAC name, based on the name for the acid followed by the suffix -oate. For example, the ester hexyl octanoate, also known under the trivial name hexyl caprylate, has the formula .

The chemical formulas of organic esters formed from carboxylic acids and alcohols usually take the form  or RCOOR', where R and R' are the organyl parts of the carboxylic acid and the alcohol, respectively, and R can be a hydrogen in the case of esters of formic acid. For example, butyl acetate (systematically butyl ethanoate), derived from butanol and acetic acid (systematically ethanoic acid) would be written .

Cyclic esters are called lactones, regardless of whether they are derived from an organic or inorganic acid. One example of an organic lactone is γ-valerolactone.

Orthoesters 
An uncommon class of esters are the orthoesters. One of them are the esters of orthocarboxylic acids. Those esters have the formula , where R stands for any group (organic or inorganic) and R′ stands for organyl group. For example, triethyl orthoformate is derived, in terms of its name (but not its synthesis) from esterification of orthoformic acid with ethanol.

Esters of inorganic acids

Esters can also be derived from inorganic acids.
Phosphoric acid forms phosphate esters, e.g. triphenyl phosphate and methyl dihydrogen phosphate
Sulfuric acid forms sulfate esters, e.g., dimethyl sulfate and methyl bisulfate
Nitric acid forms nitrate esters, e.g. methyl nitrate and nitroglycerin
Boric acid forms borate esters , e.g. trimethyl borate
Carbonic acid forms carbonate esters, e.g. ethylene carbonate (if one classifies carbonic acid as an inorganic compound)
Trithiocarbonic acid forms trithiocarbonate esters, e.g. dimethyl trithiocarbonate (if one classifies trithiocarbonic acid as an inorganic compound)
Thiocyanic acid forms thiocyanate esters, e.g. methyl thiocyanate (if one classifies thiocyanic acid as an inorganic compound)
Inorganic acids that exist as tautomers form two or more kinds of esters.
Phosphorous acid forms two kinds of esters: phosphite esters, e.g. triethyl phosphite, and phosphonate esters, e.g. diethyl phosphonate
Thiosulfuric acid forms two kinds of thiosulfate esters, e.g. O,O-dimethyl thiosulfate and O,S-dimethyl thiosulfate
Some inorganic acids that are unstable or elusive form stable esters.
Chromic acid, which has never been detected, forms di-tert-butyl chromate
Sulfurous acid, which is rare, forms dimethyl sulfite

In principle, all metal and metalloid alkoxides, of which many hundreds are known, could be classified as esters of the hypothetical acids, e.g. aluminium triethoxide could be classified as an ester of aluminic acid which is aluminium hydroxide, tetraethyl orthosilicate could be classified as an ester of orthosilicic acid, and titanium ethoxide could be classified as an ester of orthotitanic acid.

Structure and bonding 
Esters derived from carboxylic acids and alcohols contain a carbonyl group C=O, which is a divalent group at C atom, which gives rise to 120° C–C–O and O–C–O angles. Unlike amides, carboxylic acid esters are structurally flexible functional groups because rotation about the C–O–C bonds has a low barrier. Their flexibility and low polarity is manifested in their physical properties; they tend to be less rigid (lower melting point) and more volatile (lower boiling point) than the corresponding amides. The pKa of the alpha-hydrogens on esters is around 25.

Many carboxylic acid esters have the potential for conformational isomerism, but they tend to adopt an S-cis (or Z) conformation rather than the S-trans (or E) alternative, due to a combination of hyperconjugation and dipole minimization effects. The preference for the Z conformation is influenced by the nature of the substituents and solvent, if present. Lactones with small rings are restricted to the s-trans (i.e. E) conformation due to their cyclic structure.

Physical properties and characterization 
Esters derived from carboxylic acids and alcohols are more polar than ethers but less polar than alcohols. They participate in hydrogen bonds as hydrogen-bond acceptors, but cannot act as hydrogen-bond donors, unlike their parent alcohols. This ability to participate in hydrogen bonding confers some water-solubility. Because of their lack of hydrogen-bond-donating ability, esters do not self-associate. Consequently, esters are more volatile than carboxylic acids of similar molecular weight.

Characterization and analysis 
Esters are generally identified by gas chromatography, taking advantage of their volatility. IR spectra for esters feature an intense sharp band in the range 1730–1750 cm−1 assigned to νC=O. This peak changes depending on the functional groups attached to the carbonyl. For example, a benzene ring or double bond in conjugation with the carbonyl will bring the wavenumber down about 30 cm−1.

Applications and occurrence 
Esters are widespread in nature and are widely used in industry. In nature, fats are, in general, triesters derived from glycerol and fatty acids. Esters are responsible for the aroma of many fruits, including apples, durians, pears, bananas, pineapples, and strawberries. Several billion kilograms of polyesters are produced industrially annually, important products being polyethylene terephthalate, acrylate esters, and cellulose acetate.

Preparation 
Esterification is the general name for a chemical reaction in which two reactants (typically an alcohol and an acid) form an ester as the reaction product. Esters are common in organic chemistry and biological materials, and often have a pleasant characteristic, fruity odor. This leads to their extensive use in the fragrance and flavor industry. Ester bonds are also found in many polymers.

Esterification of carboxylic acids with alcohols
The classic synthesis is the Fischer esterification, which involves treating a carboxylic acid with an alcohol in the presence of a dehydrating agent:

The equilibrium constant for such reactions is about 5 for typical esters, e.g., ethyl acetate. The reaction is slow in the absence of a catalyst. Sulfuric acid is a typical catalyst for this reaction. Many other acids are also used such as polymeric sulfonic acids. Since esterification is highly reversible, the yield of the ester can be improved using Le Chatelier's principle:
 Using the alcohol in large excess (i.e., as a solvent).
 Using a dehydrating agent: sulfuric acid not only catalyzes the reaction but sequesters water (a reaction product). Other drying agents such as molecular sieves are also effective.
 Removal of water by physical means such as distillation as a low-boiling azeotropes with toluene, in conjunction with a Dean-Stark apparatus.

Reagents are known that drive the dehydration of mixtures of alcohols and carboxylic acids. One example is the Steglich esterification, which is a method of forming esters under mild conditions. The method is popular in peptide synthesis, where the substrates are sensitive to harsh conditions like high heat. DCC (dicyclohexylcarbodiimide) is used to activate the carboxylic acid to further reaction. 4-Dimethylaminopyridine (DMAP) is used as an acyl-transfer catalyst.

Another method for the dehydration of mixtures of alcohols and carboxylic acids is the Mitsunobu reaction:

Carboxylic acids can be esterified using diazomethane:

Using this diazomethane, mixtures of carboxylic acids can be converted to their methyl esters in near quantitative yields, e.g., for analysis by gas chromatography. The method is useful in specialized organic synthetic operations but is considered too hazardous and expensive for large-scale applications.

Esterification of carboxylic acids with epoxides
Carboxylic acids are esterified by treatment with epoxides, giving β-hydroxyesters:

This reaction is employed in the production of vinyl ester resin from acrylic acid.

Alcoholysis of acyl chlorides and acid anhydrides 
Alcohols react with acyl chlorides and acid anhydrides to give esters:

The reactions are irreversible simplifying work-up. Since acyl chlorides and acid anhydrides also react with water, anhydrous conditions are preferred. The analogous acylations of amines to give amides are less sensitive because amines are stronger nucleophiles and react more rapidly than does water. This method is employed only for laboratory-scale procedures, as it is expensive.

Alkylation of carboxylate salts
Although not widely employed for esterifications, salts of carboxylate anions can be alkylating agent with alkyl halides to give esters. In the case that an alkyl chloride is used, an iodide salt can catalyze the reaction (Finkelstein reaction). The carboxylate salt is often generated in situ. In difficult cases, the silver carboxylate may be used, since the silver ion coordinates to the halide aiding its departure and improving the reaction rate. This reaction can suffer from anion availability problems and, therefore, can benefit from the addition of phase transfer catalysts or highly polar aprotic solvents such as DMF.

Transesterification
Transesterification, which involves changing one ester into another one, is widely practiced:

Like the hydrolysation, transesterification is catalysed by acids and bases. The reaction is widely used for degrading triglycerides, e.g. in the production of fatty acid esters and alcohols. Poly(ethylene terephthalate) is produced by the transesterification of dimethyl terephthalate and ethylene glycol: 
 → 

A subset of transesterification is the alcoholysis of diketene. This reaction affords 2-ketoesters.

Carbonylation
Alkenes undergo "hydroesterification" in the presence of metal carbonyl catalysts. Esters of propanoic acid are produced commercially by this method:

A preparation of methyl propionate is one illustrative example. 

The carbonylation of methanol yields methyl formate, which is the main commercial source of formic acid. The reaction is catalyzed by sodium methoxide:

Addition of carboxylic acids to alkenes and alkynes
In hydroesterification, alkenes and alkynes insert into the  bond of carboxylic acids. Vinyl acetate is produced industrially by the addition of acetic acid to acetylene in the presence of zinc acetate catalysts: Presently, zinc acetate is used as the catalyst:

Vinyl acetate can also be produced by palladium-catalyzed reaction of ethylene, acetic acid, and oxygen:

Silicotungstic acid is used to manufacture ethyl acetate by the alkylation of acetic acid by ethylene:

From aldehydes
The Tishchenko reaction involve disproportionation of an aldehyde in the presence of an anhydrous base to give an ester. Catalysts are aluminium alkoxides or sodium alkoxides. Benzaldehyde reacts with sodium benzyloxide (generated from sodium and benzyl alcohol) to generate benzyl benzoate. The method is used in the production of ethyl acetate from acetaldehyde.

Other methods 
 Favorskii rearrangement of α-haloketones in presence of base
 Baeyer–Villiger oxidation of ketones with peroxides
 Pinner reaction of nitriles with an alcohol
 Nucleophilic abstraction of a metal–acyl complex
Hydrolysis of orthoesters in aqueous acid
Cellulolysis via esterification
 Ozonolysis of alkenes using a work up in the presence of hydrochloric acid and various alcohols.
 Anodic oxidation of methyl ketones leading to methyl esters.
 Interesterification exchanges the fatty acid groups of different esters.

Reactions 
Esters react with nucleophiles at the carbonyl carbon. The carbonyl is weakly electrophilic but is attacked by strong nucleophiles (amines, alkoxides, hydride sources, organolithium compounds, etc.). The C–H bonds adjacent to the carbonyl are weakly acidic but undergo deprotonation with strong bases. This process is the one that usually initiates condensation reactions. The carbonyl oxygen in esters is weakly basic, less so than the carbonyl oxygen in amides due to resonance donation of an electron pair from nitrogen in amides, but forms adducts.

Hydrolysis and saponification 
Esterification is a reversible reaction. Esters undergo hydrolysis under acidic and basic conditions. Under acidic conditions, the reaction is the reverse reaction of the Fischer esterification. Under basic conditions, hydroxide acts as a nucleophile, while an alkoxide is the leaving group. This reaction, saponification, is the basis of soap making.

The alkoxide group may also be displaced by stronger nucleophiles such as ammonia or primary or secondary amines to give amides: (ammonolysis reaction)

This reaction is not usually reversible. Hydrazines and hydroxylamine can be used in place of amines. Esters can be converted to isocyanates through intermediate hydroxamic acids in the Lossen rearrangement.

Sources of carbon nucleophiles, e.g., Grignard reagents and organolithium compounds, add readily to the carbonyl.

Reduction 
Compared to ketones and aldehydes, esters are relatively resistant to reduction. The introduction of catalytic hydrogenation in the early part of the 20th century was a breakthrough; esters of fatty acids are hydrogenated to fatty alcohols.

A typical catalyst is copper chromite. Prior to the development of catalytic hydrogenation, esters were reduced on a large scale using the Bouveault–Blanc reduction. This method, which is largely obsolete, uses sodium in the presence of proton sources.

Especially for fine chemical syntheses, lithium aluminium hydride is used to reduce esters to two primary alcohols. The related reagent sodium borohydride is slow in this reaction. DIBAH reduces esters to aldehydes.

Direct reduction to give the corresponding ether is difficult as the intermediate hemiacetal tends to decompose to give an alcohol and an aldehyde (which is rapidly reduced to give a second alcohol). The reaction can be achieved using triethylsilane with a variety of Lewis acids.

Claisen condensation and related reactions 
As for aldehydes, the hydrogen atoms on the carbon adjacent ("α to") the carboxyl group in esters are sufficiently acidic to undergo deprotonation, which in turn leads to a variety of useful reactions. Deprotonation requires relatively strong bases, such as alkoxides. Deprotonation gives a nucleophilic enolate, which can further react, e.g., the Claisen condensation and its intramolecular equivalent, the Dieckmann condensation. This conversion is exploited in the malonic ester synthesis, wherein the diester of malonic acid reacts with an electrophile (e.g., alkyl halide), and is subsequently decarboxylated. Another variation is the Fráter–Seebach alkylation.

Other reactions 
 Methyl esters are often susceptible to decarboxylation in the Krapcho decarboxylation.
 Phenyl esters react to hydroxyarylketones in the Fries rearrangement.
 Specific esters are functionalized with an α-hydroxyl group in the Chan rearrangement.
 Esters with β-hydrogen atoms can be converted to alkenes in ester pyrolysis.
A direct conversion of esters to nitriles.
 Pairs of esters are coupled to give α-hydroxyketones in the acyloin condensation

Protecting groups 
As a class, esters serve as protecting groups for carboxylic acids. Protecting a carboxylic acid is useful in peptide synthesis, to prevent self-reactions of the bifunctional amino acids. Methyl and ethyl esters are commonly available for many amino acids; the t-butyl ester tends to be more expensive. However, t-butyl esters are particularly useful because, under strongly acidic conditions, the t-butyl esters undergo elimination to give the carboxylic acid and isobutylene, simplifying work-up.

Hazards 
Esters react with strong oxidizing acids, which may cause a violent reaction that is sufficiently exothermic to ignite the esters and the reaction products. Heat is also generated by the interaction of esters with alkali solutions. Very flammable hydrogen gas is generated by mixing esters with alkali metals and ionic hydrides.

List of ester odorants 

Many esters have distinctive fruit-like odors, and many occur naturally in the essential oils of plants. This has also led to their common use in artificial flavorings and fragrances which aim to mimic those odors.

See also
 List of esters
 Amide
 Thioamide
 Carboximidate
 Carbamate
 Xanthate
 Amidine
 Cyanate
 Thiocyanate
 Selenocyanate
 Tellurocyanate
 Polyester, plastics made of polymeric ester
 Oligoester, a polymeric ester made of small number of ester monomers
 Polyolester, an ester that is a synthetic oil used in refrigeration compressors
 Thioester
 Transesterification
 Ether lipid, an ester that is a lipid and an ether
 Acylal
 Ortho ester, an ester of an ortho acid (e.g. esters of orthocarboxylic acids, orthocarbonic acid, orthosilicic acid, orthotelluric acid, orthophosphoric acid, orthoboric acid, ...)
 Depside, a polymeric ester, a type of polyphenolic compound composed of two or more monocyclic aromatic  units linked by an ester group
 Depsipeptide, a type of ester that is a peptide in which one or more of its amide groups are replaced by the corresponding ester groups
 Glyceride, an ester of fatty acids and glycerol
 Lactone, a cyclic carboxylic ester
 Lactide, a type of lactone ester
 Vitamin C (ascorbic acid), a lactone ester, an essential nutrient for humans and other animals
 Phthalide, a type of lactone ester
 Coumarin, a type of lactone ester
 Macrolide, a class of natural esters that consist of a large macrocyclic lactone ring to which one or more deoxy sugars may be attached
 Formate
 Chloroformate

References

External links 

 An introduction to esters
 Molecule of the month: Ethyl acetate and other esters

Functional groups